The 38th annual Venice International Film Festival was held on 2 to 12 September, 1981.

Jury
The following people comprised the 1981 jury:
 Italo Calvino (Italy) (head of jury)
 Marie-Christine Barrault (France)
 Peter Bogdanovich (USA)
 Luigi Comencini (Italy)
 Manoel de Oliveira (Portugal)
 Jesús Fernández Santos (Spain)
 Mohammed Lakhdar-Hamina (Algeria)
 Sergei Solovyov (Soviet Union)
 Krzysztof Zanussi (Poland)

Films in competition

Awards
The following awards were presented at the 38th edition:

Official selection
In Competition
Golden Lion - Marianne and Juliane (Die bleierne Zeit) by Margarethe von Trotta
Grand Special Jury Prize:
Sweet Dreams (Sogni d'oro) by Nanni Moretti
They Don't Wear Black-tie (Eles não usam black tie) by Leon Hirszman
Silver Lion - Do You Remember Dolly Bell? (Sjećaš li se Doli Bel?) by Emir Kusturica
Best Actress (assigned, but not Volpi Cup) - Barbara Sukowa & Jutta Lampe (Marianne and Juliane)

Collateral Awards
FIPRESCI Prize
Marianne and Juliane (Die bleierne Zeit) by Margarethe von Trotta
They Don't Wear Black-tie (Eles não usam black tie) by Leon Hirszman
Do You Remember Dolly Bell? (Sjećaš li se Doli Bel?) by Emir Kusturica

References 

Edoardo Pittalis - Roberto Pugliese, Bella di Notte, August 1996
L'Europeo, Cinema in Laguna, SePtember 2008

External links 

Venice Film Festival 1981 Awards on IMDb

Venice
Venice
Venice 
Venice Film Festival
Film
Venice International Film Festival